The 2012–13 Liga EBA season is the 19th edition of the Liga EBA. This is the fourth division of Spanish basketball. Four teams will be promoted to LEB Plata. The regular season will start in October 2012 and will finish in March 2013. Promotion playoffs to LEB Plata will be in April 2012.

Format

Regular season
Teams are divided in five groups by geographical criteria. Group A is also divided in two:
Sub-group A-A: Cantabria, Basque Country, La Rioja and Castile and León (except Zamora teams).
Sub-group A-B: Galicia, Asturias and Zamora.
Group B: Community of Madrid, Castile-La Mancha and Canary Islands.
Group C: Catalonia and Aragón.
Group D: Andalusia, Extremadura and Melilla.
Group E: Valencian Community, Region of Murcia and Balearic Islands.

Final play-off
The three best teams of each group plus a fourth qualified decided with special criteria will play a double leg play-off. From these 16 teams, only four will be promoted to LEB Plata.

The final promotion playoffs will be played with Final Four formats where the first qualified of each group will host one of the stages.

Regular season tables

Group A

Sub group AA

Sub group AB

Group A final standings

Group B

Group C

Group D

Classification playoffs

Final round
The 16 qualified teams will be divided in four groups of four teams. The first qualified teams will host the groups, played with a round-robin format. They will be played from 24 to 26 May 2013.

The winner of each group will promote to LEB Plata.

Group 1 (Cambados)

Group 2 (Madrid)

Group 3 (Tarragona)

Group 4 (Plasencia)

Playoffs table

External links
Liga EBA at FEB.es

Liga EBA seasons
EBA